Jafarabad (also romanized as Ja‘farābād) is a village in Karian Rural District, in the Central District of Minab County, Hormozgan Province, Iran. At the 2006 census, its population was 222, in 53 families.

References 

Populated places in Minab County